Rivona or Rivana is a census town in Sanguem taluka, South Goa district in the state of Goa, India.

See also
Vimleshwar temple, Rivona

References

Cities and towns in South Goa district
Villages in South Goa district